Roger Federer defeated Richard Gasquet in the final, 2–6, 6–3, 6–2 to win the men's singles tennis title at the 2006 Canadian Open.

Rafael Nadal was the defending champion, but lost in the third round to Tomáš Berdych.

Seeds

  Roger Federer (champion)
  Rafael Nadal (third round)
  David Nalbandian (first round)
  Ivan Ljubičić (third round)
  James Blake (second round)
  Nikolay Davydenko (first round)
  Tommy Robredo (second round)
  Radek Štěpánek (withdrew due to a back strain)
  Andy Roddick (withdrew due to an abdominal strain)
  Marcos Baghdatis (first round)
  Lleyton Hewitt (second round, retired due to a knee injury)
  David Ferrer (first round)
  Tomáš Berdych (quarterfinals)
  Jarkko Nieminen (quarterfinals)
  Fernando González (semifinals)
  Tommy Haas (second round)
  Robby Ginepri (first round)

Draw

Finals

Top half

Section 1

Section 2

Bottom half

Section 3

Section 4

External links
Draw
Qualifying Draw

Masters - Singles